Buckrabanyule is a tiny township in the north-central area of the state of Victoria in Australia.

The Post Office opened on 23 November 1875. It was renamed Hallam in 1884 when an office named Buckrabanyule R.S (for Railway Station) was opened some distance away.

This latter office became Buckrabanyule in 1902 and closed in 1992.

Buckrabanyule is an Australian Aboriginal name meaning "last of the hills" or "last of the ranges", which is a rather appropriate description, since geographically, Mount Buckrabanyule (which lies just north of the township) is at the very end of the north-eastern extension of the Great Dividing Range. Standing atop Mount Buckrabanyule and looking north, the landscape is very flat all the way to the horizon. Until recently, thanks to the efforts of the Wychitella and District Landcare Group, the mountain was covered in a noxious weed, wheel cactus Opuntia robusta. Its population is only 14, and only qualifies as a "township" because several farmhouses are within a few kilometre's radius. Buckrabanyule is effectively a ghost town, as many residents left probably due to a shift from railway to road transport and its remote location.

The remains of a Community Hall, Fire Station, Post Office and grain silos beside the railway line are all that is left. A church used to operate but was destroyed in a windstorm.

The primary school records are available for the earlier stages of the community history.

On 2 August 2009, the community celebrated 100 years of the Buckrabanyule Hall, which was built in 1909 and officially opened on 31 July 1909. The hall is still regularly used by locals for meetings, community get-togethers and the annual Christmas tree.

References

Towns in Victoria (Australia)